Albert Füracker  (born 3 February 1968)  is a German politician of the Christian Social Union of Bavaria (CSU). He has been a member of the Landtag of Bavaria since September 2008 and has served as Minister for Finance and Home Affairs of Bavaria since March 2018,

Political career
Between 1986 and 2003, Füracker was a member of the Young Union. He has been a member of the CSU since 1987.

From 2009 until 2013, Füracker chaired the Committee on Food, Agriculture and Forestry. He also served on the Parliamentary Commission on the Energy Transition from 2012 until 2013.

From 2013 until 2018, Füracker was a member of the state government of Minister-President Horst Seehofer of Bavaria. During that time, he served as State Secretary at the State Ministry of Finance under the leadership of Minister Markus Söder.

Since 2018 Füracker has been serving as State Minister of Finance, Regional Development and Home Affairs in the state government of Minister-President Markus Söder of Bavaria.

Füracker was nominated by his party as delegate to the Federal Convention for the purpose of electing the President of Germany in 2022.

Other activities

Regulatory agencies
 Stability Council, Ex-Officio Member (since 2018)

Corporate boards
 KfW, Member of the Board of Supervisory Directors 
 Messe München, Ex-Officio Member of the Supervisory Board
 Messe Nuremberg, Ex-Officio Member of the Supervisory Board

Non-profit organizations
 Bavarian Research Foundation, Ex-Officio Member of the Board of Trustees
 Deutsches Museum, Member of the Board of Trustees
 Ifo Institute for Economic Research, Member of the Board of Trustees
 Stiftung Bayerische Gedenkstätten, Ex-Officio Member of the Board of Trustees
 Lions Club, Member

See also
List of Bavarian Christian Social Union politicians

References

Ministers of the Bavaria State Government
Christian Social Union in Bavaria politicians
1968 births
Living people